Parliamentary elections were held in the Federated States of Micronesia on 5 March 2019, alongside a referendum on calling a Constitutional Convention. All 14 seats in Congress were up for election, and all 13 incumbents standing for re-election were returned to Congress.

A majority of voters voted in favour of calling a Constitutional Convention, which was subsequently elected on 5 November 2019.

Electoral system
The 14 members of Congress were elected by two methods; ten are elected in single-member constituencies by first-past-the-post voting for two year terms. Four were at-large Senator, with one elected from each state for a four-year term.

Following the elections, the President and Vice-President are elected by the Congress, with only the four at-large Senators allowed to be candidates.

Unlike a constitutional referendum, which requires 75% of the vote in three of the four states to vote in favour in order for the proposal to be approved, referendums on calling constitutional referendums require only a simple majority of the vote.

Campaign
A total of 32 candidates were originally registered to contest the elections, although Chuuk Electoral District 1 candidate Mithasy Mark later dropped out, leaving Florencio Singkoro Harper to run unopposed. Former President Joseph Urusemal was the only candidate for the Senatorial seat in Yap State, whilst Victor Gouland ran unopposed in Electoral District 2 in Chuuk State.

Referendums
A national referendum was held alongside the parliamentary election in which voters were asked whether they were in favor of calling a constitutional convention.

An independence referendum was scheduled to be held in Chuuk State on the same day, but was postponed.

Results
Incumbent president Peter M. Christian was not elected to Congress, making him ineligible for a second term. He lost the Pohnpei At-Large election by 59 votes.

Congress

Referendum
The referendum proposal was approved by 61% of voters overall. A majority was in favour in Kosrae and Pohnpei, but it was rejected in Chuuk and Yap. However, as an overall majority of voters approved the proposal, a Constitutional Convention was elected on 5 November 2019.

By state

Aftermath 
On 4 July 2019, a special election was held in Pohnpei and Kosrae to fill the at-large seats vacated by President Panuelo and Vice President George, respectively. Peter M. Christian was elected in Pohnpei, while Aren Palik won in Kosrae.

References

Micronesia
2019 in the Federated States of Micronesia
Election and referendum articles with incomplete results
Elections in the Federated States of Micronesia
March 2019 events in Oceania